The United States and Liechtenstein executed their first treaty in 1926. Diplomatic relations were established in 1997. Since then, the relations between the two nations have been stable. Representatives of both countries in 2002 signed a mutual legal assistance treaty focused largely on jointly combating money laundering and other illegal banking activities.

The United States does not have an embassy in Liechtenstein, but the ambassador to Switzerland, located in Bern, is also accredited to Liechtenstein. As of August 12, 2022, the ambassador is Scott Miller. Liechtenstein, however, does have an embassy in the United States, located in Washington, D.C.

See also 
 Foreign relations of the United States
 Foreign relations of Liechtenstein

References

External links
 History of Liechtenstein - U.S. relations

 
Bilateral relations of the United States
United States